Quercus yonganensis is a species of oak native to southeast China. It is placed in subgenus Cerris, section Cyclobalanopsis, the ring-cupped oaks.

References

yonganensis
Trees of China
Endemic flora of China
Plants described in 1991